Swedish bandy champions is a title held by the winners of the final of the highest Swedish bandy league played each year, Elitserien.

Sune Almkvist have the most titles, with nine each.

Below is a list of the players awarded medals.

Players

A

Erik Andéhn - Djurgården 1908

F

Gunnar Friberg - Djurgården 1908
Ivar Friberg - Djurgården 1908, 1912
Götrik Frykman - Djurgården 1908, 1912

G

Knut Gustafsson - Djurgården 1912

J

Gottfrid Johansson - Djurgården 1908, 1912

K

Karl-Gunnar Karlsson-Arnö - Djurgården 1912

L

Erik Lavass - Djurgården 1908, 1912

M

Bror Modén - Djurgården 1908

N

Algot Nilsson - Djurgården 1908

O

Karl Öhman - Djurgården 1908, 1912

S

Jean Söderberg - Djurgården 1912
Sten Söderberg - Djurgården 1912
Arvid Spångberg - Djurgården 1908

W

Birger Walla - Djurgården 1908
Folke Wahlgren - Djurgården 1912
Ragnar Wicksell - Djurgården 1912

References

See also
List of Swedish bandy champions
List of Swedish bandy junior champions